Gods Lake or God's Lake may refer to:

Fiction
Animism: The Gods' Lake TV series and game

Populated places 
 Gods Lake, Manitoba
 Gods Lake Narrows, Manitoba

Administrative areas 
 God's Lake 23, Manitoba, an Indian Reserve
 God's Lake Old Growth White Pine Forest Conservation Reserve, Ontario
 God's Lake Southeast Of Community, Manitoba, an Indian Reserve

Water features 
 Gods Lake (Alberta)
 Gods Lake, a lake located northeast of Lake Winnipeg
 Gods Lake (Swan Lake), a small lake located west of Lake Winnipeg
 God's Lake (Ontario)